= ACEA-1328 =

NMDA receptor antagonist at the glycine site

Names
- IUPAC name 6,7-dimethyl-5-nitro-1,4-dihydroquinoxaline-2,3-dione

Identifiers
CAS Number	160954-05-2
3D model (JSmol)	Interactive image
ChEMBL	ChEMBL41460
ChemSpider	7991843
PubChem CID	9816093
- InChI: InChI=1S/C10H9N3O4/c1-4-3-6-7(8(5(4)2)13(16)17)12-10(15)9(14)11-6/h3H,1-2H3,(H,11,14)(H,12,15) Key: CYJRVSOLVYLORV-UHFFFAOYSA-N
- SMILES: CC1=CC2=C(C(=C1C)[N+](=O)[O-])NC(=O)C(=O)N2

Properties
Chemical formula	C_{10}H_{9}N_{3}O_{4}
Molar mass	235.199 g·mol^{−1}
- Except where otherwise noted, data are given for materials in their standard state (at 25 °C [77 °F], 100 kPa). Infobox references

ACEA-1328 is an NMDA receptor antagonist.

== Pharmacodynamics ==
ACEA-1328 acts as an antagonist of the glycine site at the NMDA receptor.

== Effects ==
=== Opioid tolerance ===
A study on mice has shown that ACEA-1328 was able to increase the analgesic action of morphine. It was also shown that it can reduce the formation of tolerance to morphine.

=== Cocaine overdose ===
ACEA-1328 (along with other drugs) has been shown to be able to reduce convulsions induced by a cocaine overdose.
